Rhiannon Frater is an American author of horror fiction. She lives in Texas.

Frater is best known for her As the World Dies trilogy, which she initially self-published and then revised and expanded for publication by Tor Books. The books are about survivors during a zombie plague. The first book in the series, The First Days, received a starred review from Publishers Weekly.<ref>"The First Days", Publishers Weekly", 5/16/2011.</ref>

Books

As the World Dies TrilogyThe First Days, self-published 2008, revised edition published by Tor Books 2011Fighting to Survive, self-published 2009, Tor Books 2013Siege, self-published 2009, Tor Books 2013After Siege, published 7 August 2020

As the World Dies Untold TalesAs the World Dies: Untold Tales Volume 1, CreateSpace, 2011As The World Dies: Untold Tales Volume 2, CreateSpace, 2012As The World Dies: Untold Tales Volume 3, CreateSpace, 2013The Untold Tales Omnibus: Zombie Stories from the As the World Dies Universe, 2014

Pretty When She DiesPretty When She Dies, CreateSpace, 2008Pretty When She Kills, CreateSpace, 2012Pretty When She Destroys, CreateSpace, 2013

Vampire BrideThe Tale of the Vampire Bride, self-published, 2009The Vengeance of the Vampire Bride, self-published, 2011

In Darkness We Must AbideDeath Comes Home, 2013Death in the Shadows, 2013The Arrival of Armando DeLeon, 2013The Gift, 2013The Vampires, 2013Dire Warnings, 2013Destruction, 2013The Fallen King, 2013The Purge, 2013Betrayal, 2013Into the Temple of Shadows, 2014Journey Into the White, 2014In Darkness We Must Abide: The Complete First Season, 2013 In Darkness We Must Abide: The Complete Second Season, 2013

Other booksThe Living Dead Boy, self-published, 2010The Last Bastion of the Living, self-published, 2012Blood & Love and Other Vampire Tales, self-published, 2012Cthulhu's Daughter and Other Horror Tales, self-published, 2012The Midnight Spell, with Kody Boye, self-published, 2013Zombie Tales from Dead Worlds, 2014The Mesmerized, Permuted Press, 2014
 The Last Mission of the Living, 2014Dead Spots'', 2015

External links
Rhiannon Frater's official website

References

American horror novelists
Novelists from Texas
American women novelists
Women horror writers
21st-century American novelists
21st-century American women writers
Living people
Year of birth missing (living people)